Alexander Henry Ball (born 3 October 1986) is an English former first-class cricketer.

Ball was born at Westminster in October 1986. He was educated at Eton College, before going up to St Catherine's College, Oxford. While studying at Oxford, he made his debut in first-class cricket for Oxford University against Cambridge University in the 2007 The University Match at Lord's. He played two further first-class matches for Oxford University, in the 2008 and 2009 University Matches. In addition to playing first-class cricket for Oxford, Ball also played two first-class matches for Oxford MCCU against Nottinghamshire in 2008 and 2009. In his five first-class matches, he scored 155 runs at an average of 22.14, with a high score of 44 not out.

References

External links

1986 births
Living people
People from Westminster
People educated at Eton College
Alumni of St Catherine's College, Oxford
English cricketers
Oxford University cricketers
Oxford MCCU cricketers